Ehud Rogers (15 October 1909 – 25 January 1996), commonly known as Tim Rogers, was a Welsh footballer who scored 17 goals from 84 appearances in the Football League playing for Wrexham, Arsenal and Newcastle United in the 1930s and 1940s. An outside right, Rogers appeared for Swansea Town in the abandoned 1939–40 Football League season, and played non-league football for Weston Rhyn, Llanerch Celts, Chirk, and Oswestry Town. Internationally, Rogers was capped for the Wales Amateur XI and played twice for his country in wartime internationals.

Life and career
Rogers was born in Chirk, Wales, on 15 October 1909. His younger brother Joe also played League football, for Manchester City and Shrewsbury Town. Rogers played football in Wales for Weston Rhyn, Llanerch Celts, Chirk and Oswestry Town. He represented his country in an amateur international against Scotland in March 1934, and earned himself a reputation as "one of the finest Welsh amateur wingers playing [in the 1933–34] season", before turning professional with Football League Third Division North club Wrexham in May. By mid-season he had scored twice from eleven league appearances.

He signed for Arsenal in January 1935, and, with Joe Hulme and Alf Kirchen both injured, played in the last five First Division matches of the 1934–35 season. He scored twice on his debut, in an 8–0 win at home to Middlesbrough, and two matches later, was a member of the team that won 1–0 in the reverse fixture to ensure Arsenal won the 1934–35 Football League titletheir third in a row. He played intermittently during the latter part of the following season, sometimes on the left wing rather than his more normal right, and took his appearance total to 16, all in league competition. He scored another three times, including both goals in a 2–0 home win against Middlesbrough.

Rogers signed for Second Division club Newcastle United in June 1936 for a £2,500 fee. He played in 38 matches in his first season, scoring 8 goals, but appeared in only 13 in the following campaign and just 5 in 1938–39. He joined Swansea Town in May 1939, and made three appearances before the 1939–40 Football League season was abandoned when war broke out.

During the war, Rogers served in the Royal Air Force and made guest appearances for clubs including Everton and Lovells Athletic. He played twice for his country in wartime internationals, both against England, in 1941 at Cardiff and in 1944 at Liverpool. He rejoined Wrexham between his two international appearances, and played once for them in the post-war Football Leagueat the age of nearly 38before returning to Oswestry Town.

After retiring as a player, Rogers returned to his native Chirk, where he worked as a newsagent and coached at his former club. He died in the town on 25 January 1996 at the age of 86.

References

External links
 British Pathe clip from 1935 showing Rogers and an Arsenal teammate

1909 births
1996 deaths
People from Chirk
Sportspeople from Wrexham County Borough
Welsh footballers
Wales amateur international footballers
Wales wartime international footballers
Association football outside forwards
Chirk AAA F.C. players
Oswestry Town F.C. players
Wrexham A.F.C. players
Arsenal F.C. players
Newcastle United F.C. players
Swansea City A.F.C. players
English Football League players
Royal Air Force personnel of World War II